Blood and Water is a 1993 short story collection of Australian author Tim Winton's drawn from the previous two short story collections, Scission and Other Stories and Minimum Of Two, as well as some previously uncollected stories.

Footnotes

1993 short story collections
Australian short story collections
Picador (imprint) books